Tadashi Fukushima (born 1 January 1944) is a Japanese equestrian. He competed at the 1968 Summer Olympics and the 1972 Summer Olympics.

References

1944 births
Living people
Japanese male equestrians
Olympic equestrians of Japan
Equestrians at the 1968 Summer Olympics
Equestrians at the 1972 Summer Olympics
Sportspeople from Okayama